Gabriel Manu (born 5 December 1981) is a Romanian football manager and former player.

Playing career
Gabriel Nicolae Manu started his football career at Sportul Studențesc București in 1990, in Junior League, where he won five national titles. In 1998, Manu was transferred at Steaua București. 1999 marked the debut as professional player, for AFC Rocar București, in Romanian second league.

Managerial career
Manu started his managerial career early, at 22 years old, at Dinamo București, in Juniors & Children Center. His greatest achievement was the Bucharest Cup, won in June 2005. Two years later, Gabriel Manu became assistant coach 1st team at FCM Dunărea Galați, in Romanian second League. The team ranked 6th at the end of championship. In the summer of 2006, Manu left and headed to CS Otopeni. He managed to promote the team to Romanian first league. In 2008, Manu was head coach and helped to promote Sportul Studențesc to Romanian first league. September 2010 marked the beginning of an extraordinary experience for Gabriel Manu. At that time, he was assistant coach of Astra Ploiești, in Romanian Liga I. In 2011, Manu went to another first league team, FCM Târgu Mureș, with Tibor Selymes as head coach.

Background
Gabriel Manu graduated "National Academy of Physical Education and Sports" with bachelor's degree in 2006. Meanwhile, Manu took and intensive course at Pro-Management Bucharest – Microsoft Certified Technical Education, called "Management and Marketing Skills" (2002–2003). Also, in 2006, Manu got his Certification from Romanian Soccer Federation for "Physical technician-preparation and training". He has a master's degree in "Sports Activities Management" from Spiru Haret University. License A – UEFA for Coaching seniors in 1st and 2nd League was obtained in 2008. Since 2009, Gabriel Manu is a member of National Soccer Coaches Association of America (NSCAA).From 2015 he get the UEFA Pro License and he was named Technical Development Officer in Romanian Coaching School at Romanian Football Federation

References

2. Interviu Youtube

External links
 News at RomanianSoccer.ro
 Interview at Romaniansoccer.ro
 Interview at Astra Ploiesti Official Site
 Presentation at Astra Ploiesti Official Site
 Interviu Youtube 
 

1981 births
Living people
Footballers from Bucharest
Romanian footballers
Association footballers not categorized by position
Liga II players
AFC Rocar București players
Romanian football managers
FC Metaloglobus București managers